Aleksandr Aleksandrovich Anufriyev (May 10, 1926 – September 26, 1966) was a Soviet athlete who competed in the 1952 Summer Olympics. He was born in village Diyur, Izhemsky District, Komi ASSR. Anufriyev competed for the Soviet Union in the 1952 Summer Olympics held in Helsinki, Finland in the 10000 metres where he won the bronze medal.

External links
profile
Biography of Aleksandr Anufriyev 

1926 births
1966 deaths
People from Izhemsky District
Soviet male long-distance runners
Olympic bronze medalists for the Soviet Union
Athletes (track and field) at the 1952 Summer Olympics
Olympic athletes of the Soviet Union
Medalists at the 1952 Summer Olympics
Olympic bronze medalists in athletics (track and field)
Honoured Masters of Sport of the USSR
Sportspeople from the Komi Republic